Wabasso may refer to:
 Wabasso (spider), an animal genus in the subfamily Erigoninae

 places in the United States
Wabasso, Florida
Wabasso, Minnesota